Hillel Oppenheimer (born Heinz Reinhard Oppenheimer; 4 April 1899 – 15 June 1971), was an Israeli professor of botany.

Biography
Hillel Oppenheimer was born in Berlin, Germany. His father was Franz Oppenheimer, a German-Jewish sociologist and political economist. Between 1917 and 1922, Oppenheimer studied botany at universities in Berlin, Frankfurt and Freiburg in Germany and at the University of Vienna in Austria, where he received his doctorate.

At the invitation of Selig Suskin, Oppenheimer immigrated to Mandate Palestine in 1925, and for some years was actively involved in attempts to establish new settlements and drain the swamps around Zichron Yaacov.

Academic career
In 1931, he commenced working as a physiologist in the Department of Botany at the Hebrew University of Jerusalem. He helped found the Faculties of Natural Science and Agriculture at the university, and was their first lecturer on the subjects of anatomy and physiology of the plant. From 1933 to 1941, Oppenheimer headed the Department of Physiology and Genetics of the Agricultural Research Station in Rehovot. From 1941 to 1953, he was head of the department for the growth of citrus tree and agricultural botany, being appointed as a professor in 1949. Oppenheimer was dean of Faculty of Agriculture at the Hebrew University from 1953 to 1954.

Awards and recognition
 In 1959, Oppenheimer was awarded the Israel Prize, in agriculture.

See also
List of Israel Prize recipients
Oppenheimer

References

1899 births
1971 deaths
Scientists from Berlin
19th-century German Jews
German emigrants to Mandatory Palestine
University of Freiburg alumni
Humboldt University of Berlin alumni
Goethe University Frankfurt alumni
University of Vienna alumni
Academic staff of the Hebrew University of Jerusalem
Israeli botanists
Israel Prize in agriculture recipients